Imperio may refer to:
Imperio, a curse in the Harry Potter series (see Magic in Harry Potter#Unforgivable Curses)
Imperio (band), Austrian band

See also

Império, a Portuguese-language 2014 Brazilian telenovela